Virgil Charles Frye (August 21, 1930 – May 7, 2012) was an American actor and former Golden Gloves boxing champion.

He grew up in Estherville, Iowa. He had two children, Sean Frye (E.T. The Extra Terrestrial) and Soleil Moon Frye (Punky Brewster), and was the father-in-law of Jason Goldberg.

Frye made an uncredited appearance in the 1969 film Easy Rider while working as a makeup artist. His credited films included roles in Nightmare in Wax (1969), The Jesus Trip (1971), Garden of the Dead (1972), Deadhead Miles (1973), The Cat Creature (1973), The Klansman (1974), Bobbie Jo and the Outlaw (1976), The Missouri Breaks (1976), Up from the Depths (1979), Dr. Heckyl and Mr. Hype (1980), Graduation Day (1981), Take This Job and Shove It (1981), Revenge of the Ninja (1983), Running Hot (1984), The Burning Bed (1984), Winners Take All (1987), Colors (1988), The Secret of the Ice Cave (1989), The Hot Spot (1990), Man Trouble (1992) and S.F.W. (1994).

Frye suffered from Pick's Disease or Frontotemporal dementia (FTD). He was the subject of a documentary made by his daughter, titled Sonny Boy, which documents a trip that Frye and his daughter, Soleil Moon Frye, took to his hometown, and the effect his illness has had on their relationship. Virgil Frye died at an Orange County nursing home on May 7, 2012.

Filmography

References

External links

Boxers from Iowa
American male film actors
American male television actors
20th-century American male actors
Male actors from Iowa
2012 deaths
People from Estherville, Iowa
1930 births
American male boxers